Novomikhaylovka is a rural locality (a village) in Alkinsky Selsoviet, Chishminsky District, Bashkortostan, Russia. The population was 62 as of 2010. There are 11 streets.

Geography 
Novomikhaylovka is located 28 km east of Chishmy (the district's administrative centre) by road. Selo sanatoriya Alkino is the nearest rural locality.

References 

Rural localities in Chishminsky District